Maorichiton schauinslandi is a species of chiton in the family Mopaliidae.

Distribution 
New Zealand

References

Mopaliidae
Molluscs described in 1909